"High Sparrow" is the third episode of the fifth season of HBO's medieval fantasy television series Game of Thrones. The 43rd episode of the series overall, "High Sparrow" was written by series co-creators David Benioff and D. B. Weiss, and directed by Mark Mylod, his directorial debut for the series. It first aired on HBO on April 26, 2015. 

In the episode, Cersei Lannister meets with the High Sparrow, the leader of a growing religious movement; Tommen Baratheon marries Margaery Tyrell; Petyr Baelish reveals to Sansa Stark that he has betrothed her to Ramsay Bolton; and Jon Snow chooses to stay at the Wall and rule as Lord Commander of the Night's Watch. Across the Narrow Sea, Arya Stark proves her loyalty to the Faceless Men, and Tyrion Lannister and Varys travel through Volantis. The episode achieved a viewership of 6.71 million in the United States, and received positive reviews from critics.

Prior to airing, the episode, along with the other first four episodes of the season, were leaked online.

Plot

In Braavos
Jaqen helps a man drink from a pool of water. The man dies and Arya realizes that the pool of water is poison for those who seek a quick death. After Arya has an altercation with fellow acolyte the Waif, Jaqen asks her how she came to be surrounded by things owned by Arya Stark if she is no one. She throws her possessions into water, but does not want to discard Needle and instead hides it.

In King's Landing
Tommen marries Margaery Tyrell, who manipulates Tommen to persuade Cersei to return to Casterly Rock, but she declines. Cersei goes to visit Margaery and finds her telling her handmaidens about her wedding night, and leaves defeated.

After being attacked by Lancel and the Sparrows in a brothel, the High Septon asks the Small Council to execute their leader, the High Sparrow. Cersei instead meets the High Sparrow and tells him that he will replace the High Septon as head of the Faith. Cersei has Qyburn send a message to Baelish.

In the North
Roose Bolton tells his son Ramsay that they cannot rely on the Lannisters now that Tywin is dead, and that they will cement House Bolton's position by having Ramsay marry Sansa. Sansa is horrified, but agrees after Baelish tells her that this will be an opportunity to take revenge for Robb and Catelyn Stark's murders.

At Winterfell, Baelish tells Roose that they have no reason to fear the Lannisters. Roose shows him Cersei's letter. Baelish reassures him of their alliance, but Roose requests to read his reply. Meanwhile, Reek goes out of his way to avoid being seen by Sansa.

Baelish and Sansa have been secretly followed by Brienne and Podrick. Stopping at Moat Cailin, Brienne recalls Renly Baratheon's assassination and her intent to kill Stannis, whom she holds responsible.

At the Wall
Jon refuses Stannis' offer of legitimization, and assigns new positions to his brothers, making Alliser First Ranger and giving Slynt charge of restoring Greyguard. Slynt refuses and insults Jon, who executes him.

In Volantis
Tyrion and Varys arrive in Volantis, where they observe a red priestess telling slaves about the "savior," Daenerys Targaryen. Tyrion goes to a brothel and is kidnapped by Jorah, who declares that he is taking Tyrion to "the queen."

Production

Writing

This episode was written by executive producers David Benioff and D. B. Weiss and contains content from two of George R. R. Martin's novels, A Feast for Crows, Arya I, Cersei III, Arya II, Cersei V, Cersei VI, Alayne III and elements of Brienne III and Brienne IV, and A Dance with Dragons, chapters Jon II, Reek III, Tyrion VI and the Blind Girl.

Like other episodes this season, "High Sparrow" deviated from Martin's books in several places. For example, Tyrion's storyline has been sped up, and Tommen is old enough to consummate his marriage with Margaery. In what Forbes called "the biggest surprise in Sunday night's episode," Sansa Stark goes to Winterfell to marry Ramsay Bolton, a role that is played in the book by a minor character impersonating Arya. Busis describes mixed feelings regarding these changes but stated "at the very least, this is going to give Sophie Turner some real meaty material." In an interview, show writer David Benioff explains that Sophie Turner's strength as an actress was one of the reasons that they decided to give her character more dramatic scenes and Bryan Cogman added that it made more sense to give the Winterfell storyline to a proven actress who was already popular with viewers than to bring in a new character.

Casting
With this episode, Michael McElhatton (Roose Bolton) is promoted to series regular. The episode has the introduction of new recurring cast members Jonathan Pryce, who plays the High Sparrow, and Faye Marsay, who plays the Waif.

Reception

Ratings
"High Sparrow" was watched by an estimated 6.71 million American viewers during its first airing, and received a 3.5 rating among adults 18–49. In the United Kingdom, the episode was viewed by 2.196 million viewers, making it the highest-rated non-terrestrial broadcast that week. It also received 0.174 million timeshift viewers.

Critical reception
The episode received positive reviews, with critics highlighting Jon's storyline and the High Sparrow's introduction. Based on 30 critic reviews, the episode received a 100% rating score approbation in Rotten Tomatoes from 30 reviews with an average score of 8.1 out of 10 and with the consensus "'High Sparrow' expertly weaves together characters from Game of Thrones' sprawling stories, though the episode ultimately belongs to Jon Snow, whose new position highlights unexpected qualities."

Critical response to changes from the books and to original material written specifically for the episode were mixed. Critics seemed to be reserving judgment on the decision to bring Sansa to Winterfell, but Entertainment Weekly commentator Hilary Busis described this as "massively gross to watch [Tommen's] TV counterpart sleep with Margaery knowing that in A Feast for Crows, he’s still playing pretend with his beloved kitty," but Myles McNutt of A.V. Club found that the character's age gave him more agency. Both Busis and McNutt noted that the changes may make the story less cluttered, with Busis saying, "combining Sansa and [the Arya impostor]'s storylines allow Benioff and Weiss to trim a good bit of fat from ASOIAF and give already-introduced characters more stuff to do."

Awards and nominations

References

External links

  at HBO.com
 

2015 American television episodes
Game of Thrones (season 5) episodes
Television episodes about weddings
Television episodes written by David Benioff and D. B. Weiss